The 1956 Sam Houston State Bearkats football team represented Sam Houston State Teachers College (now known as Sam Houston State University) as a member of the Lone Star Conference (LSC)  during the 1956 NCAA College Division football season. Led by fifth-year head coach Paul Pierce, the Bearkats compiled an overall record of 10–0 with a mark of 6–0 in conference play, and finished as LSC champion.

Schedule

References

Sam Houston State
Sam Houston Bearkats football seasons
Lone Star Conference football champion seasons
College football undefeated seasons
Sam Houston State Bearkats football